Watched may refer to:	

Watched, novel by C. J. Lyons 2014
Watched (film), film with Stacy Keach and Harris Yulin 1974
Watched (video game)